The Sky Above Us with James Albury is a short American astronomy show hosted by James Albury, director of the Kika Silva Pla Planetarium at Santa Fe College.  Each episode is approximately five minutes in length; and, a new episode is released every two or three weeks.  Prior to hosting this series, Albury had spent eight years co-hosting the long-running PBS astronomy series, Star Gazers.  The series is produced at Santa Fe College in Gainesville, Florida.

James Albury announced the launch of the astronomy series on his Facebook fan page.  In a post dated January 16, 2020, Albury reported that the first episode, March of the Planets!, had been recorded earlier that same day.  In that same post, Albury stated that the new series would debut during the last week of February in 2020.  The first episode was released online on February 26, 2020.

Content 
The Sky Above Us is an educational series which describes upcoming celestial events.  Although the show is aimed at the general public, it also contains information which might be of interest to experienced amateur astronomers.  The program teaches viewers how to locate constellations and stars in the sky and presents interesting facts about celestial objects.

Due the quarantining efforts during the 2020 outbreak of the SARS-Cov2 virus, an animated version of James Albury was used for 7 episodes (2020-05 "So Long Comet Atlas" through 2020-12 "Center of the Galaxy").

In an April 19, 2020 post on the show's Facebook fan page, James Albury said that the show's theme song was Elastic Vibe from the album, Possible Light by Ziv Moran.

On April 1, 2021, as part of an 'April Fools' Day' prank, James Albury posted on the show's Facebook fan page a rant that he was giving up on Astronomy and changing sciences.  He followed the rant with a link to the episode Karst! which focused on Geology, rather than the usual Astronomical topics.

Episodes

Audio Podcast 

In addition to the short online television episodes, James Albury and Professor Andy Sheppard also cohosted a series of The Sky Above Us audio podcasts.  Each episode of the audio podcast series was approximately half an hour in length.

See also 

 Looking Up with Dean Regas and Anna Hehman, a twice per month podcast on astronomy and space
 The Sky at Night, a monthly television show on astronomy produced by the BBC
 SkyWeek, a weekly television show on astronomy
 Star Gazers, a weekly television show on astronomy
 StarDate (radio), a daily syndicated radio show highlighting upcoming celestial events
White House Astronomy Night

References

External links 
 James Albury YouTube Channel
 The Sky Above Us Podcast

 The Sky Above Us with James Albury Fan Page on Facebook
 Official The Sky Above Us Website

Astronomy education television series
2020 American television series debuts